The Heinrich Tessenow Gold Medal (Heinrich-Tessenow-Medaille) is an architecture award established in 1963 by the Alfred Toepfer Stiftung F.V.S. of Hamburg in honour of Heinrich Tessenow. It is awarded by the Heinrich-Tessenow-Gesellschaft e.V. "to honour people who have achieved distinction in craft and industrial form-making and in the teaching of the culture of living and building, and who have through their life's work acted in the spirit of Heinrich Tessenow". Until 2006, the medal was awarded annually.

Winners 

 1963: Franz Schuster, Vienna
 1964: Kay Fisker, Copenhagen
 1965: , Hanover
 1966: , Dresden
 1967: , Stuttgart
 1968: Wilhelm Wagenfeld, Stuttgart 
 1969: , Stuttgart 
 1970: Wilhelm Hübotter, Hanover
 1971: , Munich 
 1972: , Munich 
 1973: Steen Eiler Rasmussen, Copenhagen
 1974: , Baden-Baden
 1975: , Hamburg
 1976: Arnold Braune, Oldenburg i. Old.
 1977: , Hamburg
 1978: , Bremen
 1979: Hellmut Weber, Stuttgart 
 1980: Helmut Hentrich, Düsseldorf
 1981: , Dragør, Denmark
 1982: , Nuremberg
 1983: Kornel E. Polgar, Waddingsveen, Holland
 1984: , Cologne
 1985: , Munich
 1987: , Hamburg
 1988: , Vienna
 1989: Peter Zumthor, Haldenstein
 1991: Theodor Hugues, Munich
 1992: Giorgio Grassi, Milan
 1993: Massimo Carmassi, Pisa
 1994: , Munich
 1995: not awarded
 1996: , Dresden and Cologne
 1997: Sverre Fehn, Oslo
 1998: Juan Navarro Baldeweg, Madrid
 1999: David Chipperfield, London
 2000: Heinz Tesar, Vienna
 2001: Eduardo Souto de Moura, Porto
 2002: , Zurich
 2003: Mikko Heikkinen and Markku Komonen, Helsinki
 2004: Gilles Perraudin, Lyon
 2005: , Zurich and Prague
 2006: Sergison Bates, London
 2007: not awarded
 2008: not awarded
 2009: Richard Sennett, New York City
 2010: not awarded
 2011: Roger Diener, Basel
 2012: not awarded
 2013: Alberto Campo Baeza, Madrid
 2014: Winfried Brenne, Berlin
 2016: Anne Lacaton and Jean-Philippe Vassal, Paris
 2017: Vittorio Magnago Lampugnani, Zürich
 2018: , Basel
 2019: , Paris

References

External links
 Heinrich-Tessenow-Medaille

Architecture awards
German awards
Awards established in 1963